Events from the year 1675 in Ireland.

Incumbent
Monarch: Charles II

Events
September 22 – King Charles II of England orders the setting up of a commission to determine the cases of Connacht transplanters.

Births
February 7 – Hugh Howard, portrait painter (d. 1737 in London)
May 4 – Robert FitzGerald, 19th Earl of Kildare (d. 1743)
George Gore, Attorney-General for Ireland (d. 1753)
Peter Holmes, politician (d. 1732)
John Hopkins, poet (d. after 1700).
Popham Seymour, landowner (k. 1699)
William Stewart, 2nd Viscount Mountjoy, soldier (d. 1728)
Approximate date – Charles Jervas, portrait painter (d. 1739)

Deaths
March 16 – Daniel Witter, Church of Ireland Bishop of Killaloe since 1669.
March 18 – Arthur Chichester, 1st Earl of Donegall, soldier and politician (b. 1606)
August 1 – Patrick Duffy, Roman Catholic Bishop of Clogher since 1673.
Sir Audley Mervyn, lawyer, politician and soldier (b. 1603?)

References

 
1670s in Ireland
Ireland
Years of the 17th century in Ireland